Lehár is a surname. Notable people with the surname include:

 Anton Lehár (1867–1962), Hungarian-Austrian officer, brother of Franz
 Franz Lehár (1870–1948), Hungarian-Austrian composer

Hungarian-language surnames